A lagometer is a display of network latency on an Internet connection and of rendering by the client. Lagometers are commonly found in computer games or IRC where timing plays a large role. Quake and derived games commonly have them.

Advanced lagometer consists of two lines  bottom and top. The bottom line advances one pixel per each snapshot received from server (by default they are being sent at 20 snapshots per second rate), while the top one advances one pixel per each frame that is rendered by client. Thus, if the machine framerate was 20 per second, both lines  top and bottom  would run at the same speed.

Bottom bars correspond to delay before sending a snapshot by a server and receiving it by a client (so called "ping"). The shorter the bar, the smaller the ping was. Red bars mean that the frame has not arrived on time, yellow ones - that the snapshot was suppressed to stay under the rate limit.
Top bars can be drawn in blue or in yellow. While server snapshots are usually received at lower rate as the client framerate, the software interpolates position and movements until it gets an update from a server, when it adjusts own state accordingly.
The height of upper bars is proportional to the interpolated time between snapshots received (so as long as they come regularly, it stays below the "zero line" and is drawn in blue), or - if snapshots stop to arrive on time - is extrapolated after the last snapshot expected (then bars cross the "zero line" and are drawn in yellow).
If those bars stay yellow for too long, client is forced to interpolate its frames beyond the "reasonable level" and finally, when the snapshot arrives, the prediction turns out to hardly correspond to the server-side version, which results in a jerky, non continuous movement of scenery (obviously lowering the quality of gameplay).

Some games that use a "lagometer" will simply remove a player from the game if their lag is too high.
In the game Minecraft, the lagometer is displayed on the debug screen, as a line graph that will go up when lag spikes.
Use the following console commands for the following games:
{| class="wikitable" border="1"
|-
! Game
! Console Key
! Command To Turn On
! Command To Turn Off
! Notes
|-
| Call of Duty
| Tilde (~)
| cg_lagometer 1
| cg_lagometer 0
| Use 'seta % #' prior the command to make the command permanently.
|-
| Call of Duty: United Offensive
| Tilde (~)
| cg_lagometer 1
| cg_lagometer 0
| Use 'seta % #' prior the command to make the command permanently.
|-
| Call of Duty 2
| Tilde (~)
| /cg_drawLagometer "1"
| /cg_drawLagometer "0"
| Use 'seta % #' prior the command to make the command permanently.
|-
| Call of Duty 4: Modern Warfare
| Tilde (~)
| /cg_drawLagometer "1"
| /cg_drawLagometer "0"
| Use 'seta % #' prior the command to make the command permanently.
|-
| Call of Duty: World at War
| Tilde (~)
| /cg_drawLagometer "1"
| /cg_drawLagometer "0"
| Use 'seta % #' prior the command to make the command permanently.
|-
| Call of Duty: Modern Warfare 2
| N/A
| /drawLagometer "1"
| /drawLagometer "0"
| In game console is not available.
Use config file (config_mp.cfg) to change default values.
Use 'seta % #' prior the command to make the command permanently.
|-
| Call of Duty: Black Ops
| Tilde (~)
| /drawLagometer "1"
| /drawLagometer "0"
| Use 'seta % #' prior the command to make the command permanently.
|-
| Quake III Arena
| Tilde (~)
| /cg_lagometer 1
| /cg_lagometer 0
|-
| Quake Live
| Tilde (~)
| /cg_lagometer 1
| /cg_lagometer 0
| cg_lagometer 2 to display the client ping estimation too
|-
| Tremulous
| Tilde (~)
| /seta cg_lagometer 1
| /seta cg_lagometer 0
|-
| Star Trek: Elite Force II
| Tilde (~)
| cg_lagometer 1
| cg_lagometer 0
|-
| Star Wars: Jedi Knight
| Tilde (~)
| /cg_lagometer 1
| /cg_lagometer 0
|-
| Source engine games
| Tilde (~)
| net_graph 1
| net_graph 0
| net_graph 2 or net_graph 3 for increased detail
|-
| Wolfenstein: Enemy Territory
| Tilde (~)
| /cg_lagometer 1
| /cg_lagometer 0
|-
| Medal of Honor: Spearhead
| Tilde (~)
| cg_lagometer 1
| cg_lagometer 0
|-
| Return To Castle Wolfenstein
| Tilde (~)
| /cg_lagometer 1
| /cg_lagometer 0
|-
| Minecraft
| N/A
| F3
| F3
|In game console is not available.
The lagometer can be visible either by pressing Shift + F3, which toggles visibility, or through the use of mods such as OptiFine.
|-
| Supreme Commander: Forged Alliance (Forever)
| N/A
| F11
| F11
|
|- 
|Roblox
|N/A
|!fps
|!fps
|It can be used in some games

Game terminology